This is a list of notable people who were born or have lived in Samara (1935–1990: Kuybyshev), Russia.

Born in Samara

19th century

1801–1900 
 Nikolai Karonin-Petropavlovsky (1853–1892), Russian writer, essayist and political activist
 David Toews (1870-1947), founding chairman of the Canadian Mennonite Board of Colonization
 Gleb Krzhizhanovsky (1872–1959), Soviet economist and a state figure
 Victor Palmov (1888–1929), Russian-Ukrainian painter and avant-garde artist
 Leonid Serebryakov (1890–1937), Russian politician and Bolshevik
 Boris Kuftin (1892–1953), Soviet archaeologist and ethnographer
 Maria Kuncewiczowa (1895–1989), Polish writer and novelist
 Enrico Rastelli (1896–1931), Italian juggler, acrobat and performer
 Gregory Ratoff (1897–1960), Russian-American film director, actor and producer
 Sergei Schelkunoff (1897–1992), Russian mathematician and electromagnetism theorist
 Vasily Yefanov (1900–1978), Soviet painter

20th century

1901–1950 
 Nikolay Simonov (1901–1973), Soviet film and stage actor
 Andrew Alford (1904–1992), American electrical engineer and inventor
 Emma Lehmer (1906–2007), Russian mathematician
 Dmitriy Ustinov (1908–1984), Russian politician, Minister of Defense of the Soviet Union from 1976 until 1984
 Lev Aronin (1920–1983), Soviet International Master of chess
 Georgy Adelson-Velsky (1922–2014), Soviet and Israeli mathematician and computer scientist
 Pavel Zhiburtovich (1925–2006), ice hockey player
 Roza Makagonova (1927–1995), Soviet actress
 Eldar Ryazanov (1927–2015), Russian film director
 Josef Gitelson (1927–2022), Soviet and Russian biophysicist
 Gennadi Poloka (1930–2014), Russian film director, cinematographer, producer and actor
 Alfred Fyodorov (1935–2001), Soviet football player and coach
 Boris Kazakov (1940–1978), Soviet football player
 Anatoli Kikin (1940–2012), Russian football player and manager
 Justas Vincas Paleckis (born 1942), Lithuanian ex-communist and politician, Member of the European Parliament
 Valentin Bogomazov (1943–2019), Russian diplomat, ambassador to Ecuador and Peru
 David Rudman (born 1943), Soviet wrestling champion, Sambo world champion, and judo European champion
 Vladimír Železný (born 1945), media businessman and politician in the Czech Republic
 Alexander Abrosimov (1948–2011), Russian mathematician and teacher
 Valery Dudyshev (born 1948), Russian scientist
 Yakov Kazyansky (born 1948), Russian musician
 Yuri Chernov (born 1949), Soviet and Russian actor of theatre and cinema

1951–1970 
 Katerina Belkina (born 1974) Russian visual artist, photographer and painter
 Lyubov Sadchikova (1951–2012), Soviet speed skater
 Ilya Mikhalchuk (born 1957), Russian politician and statesman
 Mark Solonin (born 1958), Russian historian of World War II
 Oleg Zaionchkovsky (born 1959), author
 Dmitry Muratov (born 1961), editor-in-chief of the Russian newspaper Novaya Gazeta
 Yuri Yakovich (born 1962), Russian chess Grandmaster
 Pavel Romanov (born 1964), Russian sociologist
 Asiat Saitov (born 1965), Russian cyclist
 Lev Khasis (born 1966), the first CEO of the X5 Retail Group (2006–2011)
 Alexander Ardakov, Russian professional pianist
 Pavel Galkin (born 1968), Russian sprinter, former Russian record holder at 60-metres (6,56)
 Olga Kuznetsova (born 1968), Russian sport shooter
 Olga Sharkova-Sidorova (born 1968), Russian fencer
 Aleksandr Tsygankov (born 1968), Russian professional football coach and a former player who last worked as a manager for FC Krylia Sovetov Samara
 Valeri Tumaykin (1968–1994), Russian professional footballer
 Tatyana Shishkina (born 1969), Kazakh judoka
 Tatiana Egorova (1970–2012), Russian footballer and manager

1971–1980 
 Yuriy Andronov (born 1971), Russian race walker
 Mark Feygin (born 1971), Russian lawyer and politician
 Maria Samoroukova (born 1971), Greek former basketball player
 Alexei Tikhonov (born 1971), Russian pair skater
 Andrei Zintchenko (born 1972), Russian professional road bicycle racer
 Irina Lashko (born 1973), Russian diver
 Dmitry Alimov (born 1974), Russian entrepreneur and investor in Internet and media businesses
 Mariya Kiselyova (born 1974), Russian swimmer
 Igor Sinyutin (born 1974), Russian former competitive figure skater
 Sergei Korchagin (born 1975), Russian football player
 Dmitri Shoukov (born 1975), Russian footballer
 Alexei Akifiev (born 1976), Russian professional ice hockey forward
 Maxim Bakiyev (born 1977), the youngest son of former president of Kyrgyzstan, Kurmanbek Bakiyev
 Svetlana Vanyo (born 1977), Russian-American swimmer, coach and private swimming instructor, World Champion medalist, Russian national record holder and 1996 Olympics finalist
 Nina Zhivanevskaya (born 1977), Russian 5-time Olympic backstroke swimmer
 Ella Diehl (born 1978), Russian badminton player
 Julia Feldman (born 1979), Israeli jazz vocalist, composer and educator
 Aleksandr Nikulin (born 1979), Russian football player
 Alexander Ryabov (born 1979), Russian professional ice hockey player

1981–1990 
 Alexander Efimkin (born 1981), director sportif for Russian professional cycling team RusVelo
 Vladimir Efimkin (born 1981), Russian retired professional road bicycle racer
 Aleksandr Anyukov (born 1982), Russian international association football defender
 Olga Arteshina (born 1982), Russian basketball player
 Maxim Shabalin (born 1982), Russian ice dancer
 Denis Vavilin (born 1982), Russian footballer
 Aleksandr Bukleyev (born 1984), Russian football (soccer) midfielder
 Ilia Frolov (born 1984), Russian modern pentathlete
 Nikita Osipov (born 1984), Belarusian ice hockey player
 Anna Tikhomirova (born 1984), Russian table tennis player
 Igor Shevchenko (born 1985), Russian footballer
 Anton Glazunov (born 1986), Russian professional basketball player
 Vladimir Isaichev (born 1986), Russian professional road racing cyclist
 Nataliya Kondratyeva (born 1986), Russian judoka
 Maxim Vlasov (born 1986), Russian professional boxer in the light heavyweight division
 Anna Mastyanina (born 1987), Russian sport shooter
 Andrei Myazin (born 1987), Russian professional football player
 Artyom Moskvin (born 1988), Russian football goalkeeper
 Vladislav Sesganov (born 1988), Russian figure skater
 Pavel Sukhov (born 1988), Russian fencer
 Semyon Varlamov (born 1988), Russian professional ice hockey goaltender
 Olga Chernoivanenko (born 1989), Russian handball player
 Artur Yusupov (born 1989), Russian professional footballer
 Artyom Delkin (born 1990), Russian professional football player
 Sergey Pomoshnikov (born 1990), Russian professional racing cyclist

1991–2000 
 Anastasia Pavlyuchenkova (born 1991), Russian professional tennis player
 Anastasia Pozdeeva (born 1993), Russian footballer
 Anna Dementyeva (born 1994), Russian artistic gymnast
 Dmitri Dragun (born 1994), Russian ice dancer
 Giorgi Gorozia (born 1995), Georgian footballer
 Andrei Lazukin (born 1997), Russian figure skater

Lived in Samara 
 Natalya Boyko (born 1946), Soviet sprint canoer
 Mikhail Fradkov (born 1950), Russian politician and statesman who was the Prime Minister of Russia from March 2004 to September 2007
 Sergei Marushko (born 1966), Russian professional footballer
 Vladimir Filippov (born 1968), Russian professional football coach and a former player, he made his professional debut in the Soviet First League in 1985 for FC Krylia Sovetov Kuybyshev
 Mikhail Volodin (born 1968), Russian professional footballer
 Alexander Brod (born 1969), Russian human rights activist
 Dmitri Ivanov (born 1970), Russian professional footballer
 Vladimir Miridonov (born 1970), Russian professional football coach and a former player
 Dmitri Yemelyanov (born 1972), Russian professional football coach and a former player
 Zurab Tsiklauri (born 1974), Russian professional footballer, he made his professional debut in the Russian Premier League in 1993 for FC Krylia Sovetov Samara
 Vitali Astakhov (born 1979), Russian professional footballer
 Dmitri Kostyayev (born 1989), Russian professional footballer
 Vasili Pavlov (born 1990), Russian professional football player who played for FC Krylia Sovetov Samara
 Maksim Paliyenko (born 1994), Russian professional football player who played for FC Krylia Sovetov Samara
 Olga I. Larkina (born 1954), Russian writer

See also 

 List of Russian people
 List of Russian-language poets

References

Samara, Russia
Samara